The Intellectual Property Office of the Philippines shortened as IPOPHL, is a government agency attached to the Department of Trade and Industry in charge of registration of intellectual property and conflict resolution of intellectual property rights in the Philippines.

It was established under Republic Act No. 8293 also known as Intellectual Property Code of the Philippines, which took effect on January 1, 1998 during the administration President Fidel V. Ramos.

Bureaus
 Bureau of Legal Affairs
 Bureau of Patents
 Bureau of Trademarks
 Bureau of Copyright and Related Rights
 Documentation, Information and Technology Transfer Bureau
 Management Information Office
 Financial, Management and Administrative Services

See also
Copyright law of the Philippines

References

External links 
 

Philippine intellectual property law
Government agencies established in 1998
Patent offices
Copyright agencies
1998 establishments in the Philippines
Department of Trade and Industry (Philippines)